Anthony Joshua vs Kubrat Pulev, was a heavyweight professional boxing match contested between defending unified WBA (Super), IBF, WBO, and IBO world champion Anthony Joshua and IBF mandatory challenger Kubrat Pulev. The event took place on 12 December 2020 at The SSE Arena in London. Joshua retained his titles via ninth-round knockout.

Background

Cancelled world title fight since 2017 
On 28 August 2017, it was announced that Joshua and Pulev would fight at the Principality Stadium in Cardiff. Matchroom promoter Eddie Hearn made the official announcement on 5 September, "I'm delighted that we will be in Cardiff at the magnificent Principality Stadium for the next step of the AJ journey. Nearly 80,000 will gather on 28 October 2017 to create another unforgettable night of boxing. Anthony will meet his mandatory challenger, [IBF] No. 1-ranked Kubrat Pulev, and the card will be stacked with world championship action, domestic title fights and the very best young stars in the game. Get ready for the next episode from the biggest star in world boxing." The official press conference took place on 11 September 2017 and the following day, a reported 70,000 tickets had been sold, making it the fastest selling event. It also set the record of largest boxing attendance to be expected indoors. The previous record was Muhammad Ali vs. Leon Spinks rematch which gathered 63,000 fans at the New Orleans Superdrome in 1978. On 16 October 2017, rumours circulated that Pulev had suffered an injury, which could see the fight being in jeopardy. The same reports suggested the injury was 10 days old, but Pulev's camp had kept it quiet. The injury was later revealed to be true and 36-year-old Carlos Takam (35–3–1, 27 KOs), who was ranked number 3 by the IBF stepped in to replace Pulev on 12 days notice. Eddie Hearn said in a statement that he received a phone call from Pulev's promoter Kalle Sauerland, advising him of a shoulder injury he sustained during sparring. Hearn revealed when the Joshua vs Pulev fight was made, he reached out to Takam's camp, knowing they would be next in line and told them to begin a training camp and stay on standby.

On 2 March 2020, both Matchroom's Eddie Hearn and Top Rank's Bob Arum officially announced Joshua and Pulev would fight at the Tottenham Hotspur Stadium in London on 20 June. On 3 April 2020, it was announced that the fight had been postponed due to the COVID-19 pandemic and that a new date for the fight "was being worked on". Up to 1,000 people were allowed to attend the fight.

The Fight 
Both fighters began cautiously in the first round, attempting to find each other's range. However, Joshua came out aggressively in the third round and forced Pulev into taking a standing count as he had turned his back on the Briton. When the fight resumed Joshua looked for the knockout and knocked Pulev down with an uppercut late in the round. Pulev beat the count and was able to hold off the champion until the bell. Despite the two knockdowns, Pulev recovered well enough to win the fourth round on some scorecards. The fight continued until the ninth round, where Joshua knocked the Bulgarian down for a third time with a "barrage of uppercuts". Pulev was once again able to continue fighting, however he was immediately hit with a right hand that knocked him out, giving Joshua the victory via ninth-round knockout.

Aftermath 
Following the fight, attention immediately turned to a potential unification bout with WBC and The Ring title holder Tyson Fury. Fury quickly posted a video on social media claiming that he would knock out Joshua "inside three rounds". Joshua responded positively, stating "that's good to hear" and "at least I can get him in the ring". Eddie Hearn, Joshua's promoter, also commented on a potential fight between the two, saying that he "can’t see any obstacles" to the fight and that he expected it to be agreed in a matter of days.

Fight card

Broadcasters 
The fight was televised live in the United Kingdom and Ireland on pay-per-view channel Sky Sports Box Office. Subscription streaming service DAZN also broadcast the fight worldwide (including in Bulgaria) as the part of DAZN's grand launch.

References 

2020 in boxing
2020 in English sport
World Boxing Association heavyweight championship matches
World Boxing Organization heavyweight championship matches
International Boxing Federation heavyweight championship matches
International Boxing Organization heavyweight championship matches
Boxing in England
Sky Sports
2020 in British sport
International sports competitions hosted by England
Sports competitions in London
Anthony Joshua vs. Kubrat Pulev
2020 sports events in London
Sports events postponed due to the COVID-19 pandemic
Boxing matches involving Anthony Joshua
DAZN